William Tayler (1808–1892) was a civil servant of the East India Company who lived in India from 1829 until 1867. He became commissioner of Patna in 1855 and in 1857 was involved in the suppression of the 1857 Sepoy Rebellion. His measures against the local people were regarded as excessively harsh by his superiors, and he was suspended and given an appointment of lower rank.

Work
An amateur artist, Tayler sketched and painted landscapes, scenes from everyday life, and the court, military, and daily dress of Indians from different walks of life. Sketches Illustrating the Manners and Customs of the Indians and Anglo Indians Drawn on Stone from the Original Drawings from Life, published in London in 1842, included six of his drawings. In 1881 and 1882, Tayler published a two-volume autobiography, Thirty-Eight Years in India, illustrated with 100 of his own drawings.

In a watercolor he portrayed the rajah of Burdwan, in West Bengal. This was probably Mahtab Chand, who was born in 1820 and was rajah from 1832 until his death in 1879. He was regarded by the British as an enlightened and loyal ruler. The painting is part of the Anne S.K. Brown Military Collection at the Brown University Library.

References

1808 births
1892 deaths
British East India Company civil servants
British people of the Indian Rebellion of 1857
19th-century English painters
English male painters
British landscape painters
19th-century English male artists